Spyros Ikonomopoulos (born 26 July 1959) is a Greek former professional footballer who played as a goalkeeper for AEK Athens.

Club career
Ikonomopoulos started his football career from the amateur club of his hometown, AO Akratas, from where at the age of 18 he moved to AEK Athens youth team. He played his debut match with the men's team at 26 December 1977, where the professional footballers went on a strike and the clubs had to compete with amateurs. The following year was promoted to the first team, where he played 19 years, until the end of his career. In his first seasons Ikonomopoulos had the "misfortune" to coexist at times with several other great goalkeepers, such as Nikos Christidis, Lakis Stergioudas, Christos Arvanitis and Theologis Papadopoulos, so the competition for the spot was particularly tough. In 1988, however, under Dušan Bajević, he started in all the matches of the season, where he saved three penalties and effectively gave AEK their first league title in 10 years. At that time the fans gave him the nickname "Mr. Championship 1989". At the start of the following year, some unfortunate performances led to his gradual decommissioning, eventually resulting in him losing his position from Antonis Minou. He did not manage to make any appearances in the league, for the entire three years from 1992 to 1994, when AEK won the same number of titles. The arrival of Ilias Atmatsidis in the team forced him to retire officially, in the summer of 1996, at the age of 37.

International career
Ikonomopoulos played a total of 12 times with Greece, between 1984 and 1989. His debut took place on 12 September 1984 in an away friendly against East Germany, when under the instructions of Miltos Papapostolou, the coach who established him some years earlier at AEK, he replaced Giorgos Plitsis at half-time.

After football
After the end of his football career, he returned to Akrata, where he developed a business activity. At some point, the AEK administration announced its decision to hold a friendly match in his honor, but it never materialized.

Career statistics

Club
{| class="wikitable" style="text-align:center"
|-
!colspan=3|Club performance
!colspan=2|League
!colspan=2|Greek Cup
!colspan=2|Europe
!colspan=2|Total
|-
!Season!!Club!!League
!Apps!!Goals
!Apps!!Goals
!Apps!!Goals
!Apps!!Goals
|-
|1977–78
|rowspan=19|AEK Athens
|rowspan=19|Alpha Ethniki
|1||0||0||0||0||0||1||0
|-
|1978–79
|0||0||0||0||0||0||0||0
|-
|1979–80
|8||0||0||0||0||0||8||0
|-
|1980–81
|26||0||6||0||1||0||33||0
|-
|1981–82
|12||0||1||0||0||0||13||0
|-
|1982–83
|1||0||0||0||0||0||1||0
|-
|1983–84
|0||0||0||0||0||0||0||0
|-
|1984–85
|2||0||0||0||0||0||2||0
|-
|1985–86
|1||0||2||0||0||0||3||0
|-
|1986–87
|0||0||0||0||0||0||0||0
|-
|1987–88
|4||0||0||0||0||0||4||0
|-
|1988–89
|30||0||4||0||2||0||36||0
|-
|1989–90
|8||0||1||0||4||0||13||0
|-
|1990–91
|2||0||1||0||0||0||3||0
|-
|1991–92
|0||0||0||0||0||0||0||0
|-
|1992–93
|0||0||0||0||0||0||0||0
|-
|1993–94
|2||0||0||0||0||0||2||0
|-
|1994–95
|0||0||0||0||0||0||0||0
|-
|1995–96
|0||0||0||0||0||0||0||0
|-
! colspan=3|Career total
!95||0||17||0||7||0||119||0

Honours

AEK Athens
Alpha Ethniki: 1978–79, 1988–89, 1991–92, 1992–93, 1993–94
Greek Cup: 1982–83, 1995–96, 1996–97
Greek Super Cup: 1989, 1996
Greek League Cup: 1990

See also
List of one-club men in association football

References

Greek footballers
Living people
Association football goalkeepers
1959 births
Greece international footballers
Super League Greece players
AEK Athens F.C. players
People from Akrata
Footballers from Western Greece